The 1874–75 Tufts Jumbos football team represented Tufts University in the 1874 college football season.

Schedule

Standings

References

Tufts
Tufts Jumbos football seasons
College football undefeated seasons
Tufts Jumbos football